Jonathan Hunt (August 12, 1787May 15, 1832) was an American lawyer and politician from Vermont. He was a member of the United States House of Representatives for the state of Vermont and was a member of the prominent Hunt family of Vermont.

Early life
Born in Vernon in the Vermont Republic, Hunt graduated from Dartmouth College, Hanover, New Hampshire, in 1807. Afterwards, Hunt studied law and was admitted to the bar in 1812. Hunt commenced practice in Brattleboro, Vermont, in 1812. He was the first president of the Old Brattleboro Bank in 1821, the first bank established in Brattleboro, a position he held for years afterward. He also carried the rank of General in the Vermont militia, as had his uncle Arad Hunt.

Political career
Hunt held many political positions in Vermont, and served as a member of the Vermont House of Representatives in 1811, 1816, 1817, and 1824. He was elected as an Adams candidate to represent Vermont's 1st congressional district in 1827. He served in the United States House of Representatives during the Twentieth, Twenty-first, and Twenty-second Congresses, serving from March 4, 1827, until his death on May 15, 1832.

Hunt was a lifelong friend of statesman and orator Daniel Webster. The brick home that Hunt had built in Brattleboro, later known as the Colonel Hooker home, was the first brick home built in town.

Death
Hunt died in Washington, D.C., on May 15, 1832, while still in office. At his death he left an estate valued in excess of $150,000. He was buried in the family plot in the Old Cemetery on the Hill in Brattleboro, Vermont.

Family life
A graduate of Dartmouth, Hunt served as a trustee of Vermont's Middlebury College, where Hunt family members had been early benefactors.

Hunt was the son of Jonathan Hunt and Lavinia (Swan) Hunt. His father was born in Massachusetts and was an early pioneer and land speculator in Vermont. He served as Lieutenant Governor of Vermont from 1794–1796. Hunt's uncle was composer and poet Timothy Swan, and his aunt was married to U.S. Congressman Lewis R. Morris.

Hunt married Jane Maria Leavitt of Suffield, Connecticut. She was part of the New England Dwight family which was heavily involved in the shipping business and in the purchase of the Western Reserve. Jane's father, Thaddeus Leavitt, was a successful merchant whose clipper ships traded with the West Indies. He invented an early cotton gin and was one of the principal purchasers of the Western Reserve lands in Ohio.

Hunt and his wife Jane had five children: artist Jane Maria Hunt, physician Jonathan Hunt, painter William Morris Hunt, architect Richard Morris Hunt and early photographer and New York attorney Leavitt Hunt. Following Hunt's death, his wife took their children to Geneva, Paris and Rome for an extended Grand Tour that stretched into a dozen years. The Hunt children were able to study the arts in European academies and become part of an American expatriate community in Europe. Four of Hunt's children returned to America. The fifth, his namesake son Jonathan, remained in Paris, where he studied medicine at the University of Paris and subsequently practiced medicine until his early death, a suicide in 1874. (Jonathan Hunt's son William Morris Hunt also committed suicide, at the Isles of Shoals in New Hampshire.) Hunt's nephew was Chicago architect Jarvis Hunt.

See also
 Richard Morris Hunt, William Morris Hunt, Leavitt Hunt, Jarvis Hunt
List of United States Congress members who died in office (1790–1899)

References

External links
 
 
 Men of Vermont: An Illustrated Biographical History of Vermonters and Sons, Redfield Proctor, Brattleboro, 1894

1787 births
1832 deaths
People from Vernon, Vermont
Hunt family of Vermont
Vermont National Republicans
National Republican Party members of the United States House of Representatives
Members of the United States House of Representatives from Vermont
Members of the Vermont House of Representatives
People from Brattleboro, Vermont
Vermont lawyers
Dartmouth College alumni
Burials in Vermont
19th-century American politicians
19th-century American lawyers